Nierstraszellidae is a family of chitons belonging to the order Lepidopleurida.

Genera:
 Nierstraszella Sirenko, 1992

References

Chitons